Vikhli is a rural locality (a selo) and the administrative centre of Vikhlinsky Selsoviet, Kulinsky District, Republic of Dagestan, Russia. The population was 1,285 as of 2010. There are 13 streets.

Geography 
Vikhli is located 10 km northeast of Vachi (the district's administrative centre) by road. Kaya and Tsyysha are the nearest rural localities.

Nationalities 
Laks live there.

References 

Rural localities in Kulinsky District